Jack Patrick Powell (born 29 January 1994) is an English professional footballer who plays as a midfielder for Crawley Town.

Career
Jack Powell was a youth team player with West Ham United before being released by the club on 30 June 2013.

On 25 November 2013, Powell joined Concord Rangers on a youth loan until 19 December 2013. He made 7 league appearances for Concord and scored one goal.

He made his senior debut for Millwall on 12 August 2014 in the League Cup against Wycombe Wanderers. He made his first start against Southampton, again in the League Cup on 26 August 2014. On 30 August 2014, Powell made his league debut against Blackpool in a 2–1 victory.

Powell joined Braintree Town on a one-month loan deal on 27 November 2015. He made his debut for Braintree Town on 28 November in a 0–0 draw with Torquay United. He returned to Millwall following the month-long loan having made just three appearances for Braintree Town. On 18 March 2016, he returned to Braintree Town on a loan deal until the end of the season. He appeared in four matches for Braintree across his loan spell at the club. Powell was released by Millwall at the end of the 2015–16 season.

On 20 July 2016, Powell joined Ebbsfleet United after impressing in a trial match.

On 12 October 2018, Powell agreed to join fellow Kent rivals, Maidstone United on a deal until the end of the season.

On 5 July 2019, Powell joined EFL League Two club Crawley Town, signing a two-year contract with the club. He made his debut for the club in a 1–0 away defeat to Portsmouth in the EFL Trophy. On 12 September 2019, Powell joined Aldershot Town on loan until January 2020. He made his league debut for Crawley on 28 January 2020 in a 2–2 draw at Plymouth Argyle.

Style of play
Powell has been described as "gutsy" and "skillful" with comparisons made with former Millwall player, Terry Hurlock. He has also been nicknamed the Peckham Pirlo.

Personal life
Powell is the older brother of Joe Powell.

Powell became a father aged 18 with his first child Shay, and his second child Jaxon was born in January 2018.

Career statistics

References

External links

1994 births
Living people
Footballers from Canning Town
English footballers
Millwall F.C. players
Concord Rangers F.C. players
Braintree Town F.C. players
West Ham United F.C. players
Ebbsfleet United F.C. players
Maidstone United F.C. players
Crawley Town F.C. players
Association football midfielders
England semi-pro international footballers
English Football League players
National League (English football) players
Aldershot Town F.C. players